Vocational Training Centre, Fars ( – Markaz Āmūzesh Fanī Ḩarefehā’) is a village and training centre in Kushk-e Qazi Rural District, in the Central District of Fasa County, Fars Province, Iran. At the 2006 census, its population was 11, in 4 families.

References 

Populated places in Fasa County